Pakhi or Pakkhi is an Indian forename.

People with the given name 
 Pakkhi Hegde (born 1972), Indian film actress
 Pakhi Tyrewala (born 1984), Indian film actress

Film 
 Pakhi (film), a Bollywood film starring Sumeet Kant Kaul and Pallavi Das